Koolmotor is the first studio album by American hip hop group Five Deez. It was released on Counterflow Recordings in 2001.

Track listing

Personnel
 Fat Jon – vocals, production, turntable, keyboard, flute
 Pase – vocals, turntable, conga
 Kyle David – vocals
 Sonic – production
 Matt Anderson – upright bass
 Brian Olive – guitar
 Charles Cooper – saxophone

References

External links
 

2001 debut albums
Albums produced by Fat Jon